Angella Belén Escudero San Martín (born 29 March 1996) is a Peruvian industrial engineer, television host,  model, and beauty pageant titleholder who holds the title of Miss World Peru 2019.

Early life and education
Escudero was born in the city of Sullana, Piura, Peru, and was raised in the city of Piura. She began modeling as a teenager and pursued a career in the city of Trujillo. She eventually graduated with a degree in industrial engineering from the Antenor Orrego Private University. While continuing working as a model, she also went on to develop a career as a television host. She participates in events to help children and teenagers living in poor conditions, she's also an advocate to take care of the environment in her native country.

Pageantry
Having started modeling as a teenager, Escudero participated in local teen pageants in her native department of Piura. She participated in the Miss World Peru 2019 having won her regional pageant, and went on to win it on August 18th, 2019.

She represented Peru at the Miss World 2019 pageant in London, United Kingdom where she did not place as a finalist on the final night.

References

External links
 

1996 births
Living people
Peruvian female models
Miss World 2019 delegates
Peruvian beauty pageant winners
Peruvian television presenters
Peruvian women television presenters
Peruvian industrial engineers
People from Piura Region